Emil Balslev (19 September 1913 – 23 June 1944) was a surveyor and member of the Danish resistance executed by the German occupying power.

Biography 

Balslev was born in Frederiksberg on 19 September 1913 to first lieutenant Viggo Balslev and U.S. born wife Nanna Elisabeth née Lyngby and baptized by a pastor Balslev in Frederiksberg Church on the twenty-fourth Sunday after Trinity.

By 1929 Balslev had moved with his family to Østerbrogade 1B, where in 1930 he lived with his parents, two older sisters and two younger brothers. His parents had at that time lost a sixth child, his father had been promoted to captain and was working as an Assistant Director at Dansk Rekyl Riffel Syndikat A/S.

In March 1944 the Gestapo made an "incredible number of arrests" including ten arrests in the region of Års, among these Balslev.

On 23 June 1944 Balslev and seven other members of the resistance were executed in Ryvangen.

After his death 
The January 1945 issue of the resistance newspaper Frit Danmark (Free Denmark) reported on the execution of the eight resistance members including Balslev.

After the liberation Balslev's remains and those of at least six of the others executed with him were found in Ryvangen and transferred to the Department of Forensic Medicine of the university of Copenhagen.

On 29 August 1945 Balslev and 105 other victims of the occupation were given a state funeral in the memorial park founded at the execution site in Ryvangen. Bishop Hans Fuglsang-Damgaard led the service with participation from the royal family, the government and representatives of the resistance movement.

References 

1913 births
1944 deaths
Danish people executed by Nazi Germany
Danish people of World War II
Danish resistance members
Resistance members killed by Nazi Germany
People from Frederiksberg